Craig Packer (born 1950, Fort Worth, Texas) is an American biologist, zoologist, and ecologist chiefly known for his research on lions in Serengeti National Park. He is the founder and director of both the Lion Research Center and Whole Village Project, as well as the co-founder of Savannahs Forever Tanzania. In addition, Packer has been a professor in the University of Minnesota's department of Ecology, Evolution, and Behavior since 1983. Since his graduation from Stanford University in 1972, Packer has become an active researcher and scientist, having published over 100 scientific articles and authored two books. For one of these books - Into Africa - Packer was awarded the John Burroughs Medal in 1995. He has received various honors and awards in recognition of his work as a biologist. Packer has been ordained with a Guggenheim Fellowship in 1990, a Distinguished McKnight University Professorship in 1997, and was elected to the American Academy of Arts and Sciences in 2003. He is a regular contributor to National Geographic and the IUCN.

Early years
Packer was born in Fort Worth, Texas in 1950. He attended his local Eastern Hills High School in 1964 and graduated in 1968. Growing up, Packer was originally interested in being a doctor or an engineer, and originally sought medical school after graduating from high school. However, these fields did not support his desire to work out in the field and to travel to exotic places. Furthermore, Packer was fascinated by evolution and animal ethology. He ultimately abandoned his place in Stanford University’s School of Medicine to work as a field assistant for Jane Goodall in Gombe National Park, Tanzania to study olive baboons. He graduated Stanford in 1972 with a bachelor’s degree in Human Biology. He later attended the University of Sussex to complete his doctoral research on baboons, graduating with a Ph.D. in Behavioral Ecology in 1977. After a subsequent study on Japanese macaques in Hakusan National Park, Packer returned to Tanzania in 1978 as the head of the Serengeti Lion Project. His interest in lions derives from their unique behavior as social carnivorans, and it is a passion he continues to exercise as director of the Lion Research Center.

Research

Baboons
While studying at Stanford, Packer was sent to Tanzania to study baboons at the Gombe Stream Research Center with Jane Goodall.  During this study, Packer was one of the first ecologists to study complex hypotheses about the adaptive significance of behavior in his studies of coalition formation in baboons and the reasons why male baboons dispersed from their troop of birth to new troops.  Packer attended the University of Sussex to complete his baboon research.

Serengeti Lion Project
In 1978 Packer began the Serengeti Lion Project to study various historical questions about lions.  One of his biggest contributions to the Serengeti Lion Project was the discovery that successive outbreaks of canine distemper virus had different impacts depending on the rainfall patterns from the previous year.  Packer studied how severe droughts led to co-infections of canine distemper virus by a tick-borne parasite, babesia. The co-infection mixed with high levels of babesia showed to be far more fatal than the distemper virus itself.

Packer also studied the effects of a full moon and its correlation to the number of lion attacks.  Along with his colleagues, he discovered that the risks of man-eating attacks are highest during the first week after the full moon, which may help explain why there are so many myths about the full moon.  They also discovered that people in southern Tanzania are most at risk from man-eating lions in areas where they have to sleep in their fields to protect their crops from nocturnal crop-pests such as bush pigs.  The lions stumble upon a novel prey species when they follow the pigs into people's fields.

Current Work
Packer works at the University of Minnesota.

Family
Packer is married to Susan James and has two children: Jonathan (1987), who is a pulmonologist in Shreveport, Louisiana and Catherine (1984), who holds an MPH from Johns Hopkins. He has two grandchildren, Sienna and Felix.

Works
Packer, C. & Pusey, A. (producers) & Matthews, R. (director). (1989). Queen of Beasts [documentary]. Tanzania National Park, East Africa: Alan Root Productions.

Packer, C. 1994. Into Africa. University of Chicago Press.

Craft, ME., Vols, E., Packer, C., Meyers, LA. 2011. Disease transmission in territorial populations: the small-world network of Serengeti Lions. Journal of the Royal Society Interface 8(59) 776-786.

Packer, C., Swanson, A., Ikanda D., Kushnir, H. 2011.  Fear of Darkness, the Full Moon and the Nocturnal Ecology of African Lions. PLoS ONE 6(7): e22285.

Packer, C. A Bit of Texas in Florida. 2010. Science 24, 329(5999) 1606-1607.

Packer, C., Kosmala, M., Cooley, H.S., Brink, H., Pintea, L., Garshelis, D., Purchase, G.,

Strauss, M., Swanson, A., Balme, G., Hunter, L., & K. Nowell. 2009. Sport hunting, predator control and conservation of large carnivores. PLoS ONE 4(6): e5941.

Mosser, A. & C. Packer. 2009. Group territoriality and the benefits of sociality in the African lion, Panthera leo. Animal Behaviour.

Welburn, S., K. Picozzi, P. Coleman & C. Packer. 2008. Patterns in age-seroprevalence consistent with acquired immunity against Trypanosoma brucei in Serengeti lions. PLoS-Neglected Tropical Diseases 2(12): e347.

Munson, L., K.A. Terio, R. Kock, T. Mlengeya, M.E. Roelke, E. Dubovi, B. Summers, A.R.E. Sinclair & C. Packer. 2008. Climate extremes and co-infections determine mortality during epidemics in African lions. PLoS-One 3, e2545.

Ikanda, D. & C. Packer. 2008. Ritual vs. retaliatory killing of African lions in the Ngorongoro Conservation Area, Tanzania. Endangered Species Research 6, 67-74.

Fryxell, J., A. Mosser, A.R.E. Sinclair & C. Packer. 2007. Group formation stabilizes predator-prey dynamics. Nature 449, 1041-1044.

Citations
Packer, C. (2010) A Bit of Texas in Florida Science 24, 329(5999) 1606-1607.Retrieved on October 15 from the Science Magazine website: https://www.science.org/doi/abs/10.1126/science.1196738

Public Broadcasting Service. (2011) Nature: Elsa’s Legacy, the Born Free Story.  Retrieved October 15, 2011 from the PBS website: https://www.pbs.org/wnet/nature/episodes/elsas-legacy-the-born-free-story/interview-lion-expert-craig-packer/6143/

University of Minnesota. (2011) College of Biologigical Sciences: Faculty and Staff.  Retrieved on October 15, 2011 from the University of Minnesota website: https://web.archive.org/web/20111018174543/http://www.cbs.umn.edu/eeb/contacts/craig-packer

See also
 Dr Packer on the issue of competition between Asiatic lions and tigers

References

American ecologists
Living people
1950 births